Ibuki Koizumi (Koizumi Ibuki, born 1 September 1996) is a Japanese sailor. He competed in the 49er event at the 2020 Summer Olympics.

References

External links
 
 

1996 births
Living people
Japanese male sailors (sport)
Olympic sailors of Japan
Sailors at the 2020 Summer Olympics – 49er
Asian Games silver medalists for Japan
Asian Games medalists in sailing
Sailors at the 2014 Asian Games
Medalists at the 2014 Asian Games
Place of birth missing (living people)